Mercedes Ron López (born 3 June 1993 in Buenos Aires, Argentina) is an Argentine audiovisual writer and communicator with Spanish nationality. She is known for the Culpables Saga, a trilogy that became known through Wattpad. She currently resides in Seville.

Early life
She was born in Buenos Aires. Coming from an Argentine family of Asturian origin. She earned a degree in Audiovisual Communication at the University of Seville. She began writing mainly on the Wattpad platform in mid-2015, where she started writing Culpa Mía. In 2016, she won a Wattys Awards badge. In March 2017, her novel Culpa Mía went on sale under the Montena seal of Penguin Random House in Barcelona. A few months later, her second book Culpa Tuya was released. In July the following year, the third and final book of the Guilty Trilogy, Culpa Nuestra, came out and was presented at the International Book Fair exhibition, in Lima, Peru. In May 2019, she premiered Marfíl, and in October Ébano.

Novels
Culpables Trilogy
Culpa Mía (2017)
Culpa Tuya (2017)
Culpa Nuestra (2018)
Enfrentados Bilogy
Marfíl (2019)
Ébano (2019)
Dímelo Trilogy
Dímelo Bajito (2020)
Dímelo En Secreto (2020)
Dímelo Con Besos (2021)

See also
 Spanish Argentines
 Wattpad
 Argentine literature

References

External links
 
 
 

1993 births
Living people
Writers from Buenos Aires
Wattpad writers
University of Seville alumni
21st-century Argentine novelists
21st-century Argentine women writers
21st-century Argentine writers
Argentine women novelists
Argentine people of Asturian descent
Citizens of Spain through descent
Argentine YouTubers